Geoffrey Stewart (Geoff) Irwin (born 30 March 1948) is an Australian politician. He was a Labor member of the New South Wales Legislative Assembly from 1984 to 1995.

Irwin was first elected to state parliament at the 1984 state election as the Labor member for the safe seat of Merrylands. His district was abolished at the 1988 state election, at which point he transferred to the similarly safe seat of Fairfield. Re-elected again at 1991 state election, Irwin retired at the 1995 state election.

Irwin was born in the western Sydney suburb of Guildford. He is married to former federal Labor MP Julia Irwin.

References

1948 births
Living people
Members of the New South Wales Legislative Assembly
Australian Labor Party members of the Parliament of New South Wales